Molynie (Mołynie) is an outlying settlement of Piskorowice in the administrative district of Gmina Leżajsk, within Leżajsk County, Podkarpackie Voivodeship, in south-eastern Poland.
It was the site of part of the Piskorowice massacre which occurred in 1945.

Villages in Leżajsk County